Jerry Lee's Greatest! is the second studio album by the American rock and roll and rockabilly pioneer Jerry Lee Lewis released in 1961 on Sun Records (SLP 1265).

Background
Although Lewis recorded with Sun Records from 1956 to 1963 - far longer than Elvis Presley or Johnny Cash - only two LPs were ever issued on Sun under Jerry Lee's name, the second being Jerry Lee's Greatest in 1961.  Part of the reason for the lack of material was no doubt producer Sam Phillips' waning enthusiasm in the wake of Lewis' scandalous marriage to his 13-year-old cousin Myra, which erupted on a tour of Britain in 1958, derailing the star's career.  In his authorized 2014 biography Jerry Lee Lewis: His Own Story, Rick Bragg quotes Phillips as he explained his reasoning to Sun researcher Martin Hawkins: "I was always very cautious about putting out a lot of product on my artists just to ensure a certain amount of income...You only have to look at some of the crap they put out on Elvis Presley, just because he was in a picture show or something...When Jerry Lee took a beating from the press it would have been stupid to try and cram product down people's throats.  Believe me, just before that happened, Jerry was the hottest thing in America."  Jerry Lee's Greatest! includes mostly later cuts from Lewis's run at Sun, with AllMusic's Cub Koda suggesting that, "While tracks like "Let's Talk About Us," "What'd I Say," and "As Long as I Live" have their own charm, this set simply isn't the place to start a Jerry Lee collection..."  The album includes Lewis' biggest hit, "Great Balls of Fire," which had been left off of his debut LP.

Track listing
Side A

Side B

† Mislabeled as "Country Music is Here to Stay" (Ferlin Husky) on the original LP.

References

External links

 Jerry Lee's Greatest! at Allmusic
 Jerry Lee's Greatest! at Rate Your Music

Jerry Lee Lewis albums
Sun Records albums
1961 albums
Albums produced by Sam Phillips
Albums recorded at Sun Studio